Rockville High School is a public secondary school located in Vernon, Connecticut.  The school also serves as a vocational agriculture school for the region. The school was established in 1870 and its current building was built in 1958.

Alumni

 Gene Pitney  2002 inductee to the Rock n' Roll Hall of Fame
 Charles Ethan Porter  African American still life painter
 Bill Romanowski  former professional American football player
 William J. Shea  Connecticut Supreme Court justice
 Mark Warner  former Governor and current Senator from Virginia

References

External links
 
 Vernon Public Schools website

Schools in Tolland County, Connecticut
Educational institutions established in 1870
Public high schools in Connecticut
1870 establishments in Connecticut